is a Japanese footballer currently playing as a defender for Thespakusatsu Gunma.

Career statistics

Club
.

Notes

References

External links

1997 births
Living people
Japanese footballers
Association football defenders
Meiji University alumni
J2 League players
Thespakusatsu Gunma players